Lepola is a surname. Notable people with the surname include:

Anton Lepola (born 1996), Finnish footballer
Esa Lepola (born 1948), Finnish Olympic swimmer
Jaakko Lepola (born 1990), Finnish footballer
Liisa Lepola (born 1998), Finnish gymnast
Arttu Lepola (born 2000),
Finnish Hörhö